2020 East Java Governor Cup was the thirteen edition of East Java Governor Cup football championship, which was held by the Football Association of Indonesia (PSSI) as pre-season tournament during 2020 Liga 1 season break. The tournament was started on 10 February 2020 and ended on 20 February 2020. The broadcasting rights were granted solely to MNCTV.

Teams
There are 8 clubs participating in the 2020 East Java Governor Cup. The clubs were divided into two groups, each filled with four participants. The tournament was attended by five club from East Java Province and three invited teams. One of the invited teams came from Malaysia.

Venues

Group stage

Group A 
 All matches played in Bangkalan, East Java
 Times listed are local (UTC+7:00)

Group B 
 All matches played in Malang, East Java
 Times listed are local (UTC+7:00)

Knockout stage

Bracket

Semi-finals

Final

Awards

Goalscorers

References 

Football Association of Indonesia
Sport in East Java